James "Killer" Cunniffe (June 10, 1895 - October 31, 1926) was an American armed robber who planned and successfully carried out the 1926 New Jersey mail robbery, one of the most well-publicized thefts during the 1920s. On October 14, 1926, he and seven others armed with submachine guns hijacked a U.S. mail truck in Elizabeth, New Jersey and escaped with $161,000. During the gunbattle with the guards, the driver was killed while his assistant and a local police officer were wounded.

Biography
He was born on June 10, 1895 in Manhattan, New York City.

The robbery received considerable coverage at the time and is regarded as one of the most high-profile robberies prior to the "Public Enemy"-era of the 1930s. Three days after the robbery, after a two-day discussion with his cabinet, then President Calvin Coolidge assigned 2,250 U.S. Marines to escort all mail shipments in the Eastern United States. A further announcement on October 27 authorized the use of 250 Thompson machine guns specifically to be used for guard duty. Already a long-favored weapon in the underworld, the Marine Corps was the first branch of the U.S. military to purchase "Tommy guns". 

Weeks after the robbery, Cunniffe was killed in a fight with fellow gang member William "Ice Wagon" Crowley when Crowley  shot and killed both Cunniffe and his girlfriend at the Highland Court Apartments in Highland Park, Michigan on October 31, 1926. Crowley was still in the apartment when police were called because of the gunshots. Officers Ernest Jones and Ephraim Rancour arrived and a shootout occurred. Jones was immediately shot and killed when Crowley opened the door and Rancour was shot in the shoulder. Enraged that his partner had been killed in front of him and wounded himself, Rancour shot Crowley dead.

References

1895 births
1926 deaths

Prohibition-era gangsters
People from Manhattan